XHSPR-TDT is a television station in Mexico City, the flagship station for the Sistema Público de Radiodifusión del Estado Mexicano (SPR) transmitter system. It broadcasts on channel 30 from a transmitter atop Cerro del Chiquihuite; its primary signal is the SPR's Canal Catorce network.

XHSPR received its permit as XHOPMA-TDT, after the original name of the SPR (Organismo Promotor de Medios Audiovisuales) and signed on in 2012. Its transmitter is located on Cerro del Chiquihuite, which is home to the majority of Mexico City's broadcast stations. Not long after, the name of the OPMA network, originally "30 TV México", was changed to "Una Voz Con Todos" to reflect that it aired on different channels in each city; the network is currently known as Canal Catorce.

The new XHSPR-TDT call sign became official on December 20, 2017.

Digital multiplex 
XHSPR's digital signal is multiplexed. This multiplex is different from that on all other SPR transmitters as it excludes Canal 11 and Canal 22 as the flagship channels of these networks service the Valley of Mexico at full power (XEIPN and XEIMT, respectively).  It also carries TV UNAM; although the UNAM operates a low-power station transmitting from Ciudad Universitaria, it operates with just 1,500 watts and does not cover all of Mexico City.

References

External links 
 SPR Official Site
 Canal Catorce Official Site

Television stations in Mexico City
Public television in Mexico
Spanish-language television stations in Mexico
2010 establishments in Mexico